Graham is an unincorporated community in Bradford County, Florida, United States. Graham has a post office with ZIP code 32042, which opened on December 4, 1901.

References

Unincorporated communities in Bradford County, Florida
Unincorporated communities in Florida
1901 establishments in Florida